Cantalupo may refer to:

Places in Italy
Cantalupo in Sabina (town in Lazio (or "Latium") region)
Cantalupo nel Sannio (town in Molise)
Cantalupo Ligure (municipality in Piedmont)
Cantalupo di Bevagna (frazione in Umbria)
there are also several other smaller frazioni (subdivisions or hamlets) of that name in Olgiate Comasco, Montano Lucino and Cerro Maggiore.

People with the surname
Jim Cantalupo (1943–2004), American businessman
Joseph Cantalupo, American mafia member

See also
Cantalupa
Cantaloupe (disambiguation)

Italian-language surnames